The 1986 Family Circle Cup was a women's tennis tournament played on outdoor clay courts at the Sea Pines Plantation on Hilton Head Island, South Carolina in the United States and was part of the Category 4 tier of the 1986 WTA Tour. It was the 14th edition of the tournament and ran from April 7 through April 13, 1986. Third-seeded Steffi Graf won the singles title, the first WTA singles title of her career.

Finals

Singles
 Steffi Graf defeated  Chris Evert-Lloyd 6–4, 7-5 
 It was Graf's 1st singles title of her career.

Doubles
 Chris Evert-Lloyd /  Anne White defeated  Steffi Graf /  Catherine Tanvier 6–3, 6–3
 It was Evert's 1st doubles title of the year and the 31st of her career. It was White's 1st doubles title of the year and the 5th of her career.

References

External links
 Official website
 ITF tournament edition details

Family Circle Cup
Charleston Open
Family Circle Cup
Family Circle Cup
Family Circle Cup